Maksym Korniyenko (born 26 June 1987) is a Ukrainian basketball player for BC Dnipro. He plays for the Ukrainian national team, where he participated at the 2014 FIBA Basketball World Cup.

References

1987 births
Living people
BC Dnipro players
BC Donetsk players
BC Juventus players
BC Khimik players
CSU Pitești players
PBC Academic players
Power forwards (basketball)
Sportspeople from Dnipro
Twarde Pierniki Toruń players
Ukrainian expatriate basketball people in Bulgaria
Ukrainian expatriate basketball people in Lithuania
Ukrainian expatriate basketball people in Poland
Ukrainian expatriate basketball people in Romania
Ukrainian men's basketball players
2014 FIBA Basketball World Cup players